This is a list of schools in Blaenau Gwent in Wales.

Primary schools

All Saints RC Primary School
Beaufort Hill Primary School
Blaenycwm Primary School
Brynbach Primary School
Brynmawr RC Primary School
Coed Y Garn Primary School
Cwm Primary School
Deighton Primary School
Ebbw Fawr Learning Community
Georgetown Primary School
Glanhowy Primary School
Glyncoed Primary School
Rhos Y Fedwen Primary School
Roseheyworth Millennium Primary School
St Illtyds Primary School
St Joseph's RC Primary School
St Mary's CW Primary School
Sofryd Primary School
Willowtown Primary School
Ysgol Gymraeg Bro Helyg
Ystruth Primary School

Secondary schools
Abertillery Learning Community
Brynmawr Foundation School
Ebbw Fawr Learning Community
Tredegar Comprehensive School
Ysgol Gymraeg Gwynllyw, Pontypool (Welsh Medium Secondary School)

Special and Alternative Provision Schools

Penycwm Special School, Ebbw Vale age range: 3-19 

 Abertillery Learning Community Special Resource Base attached at Secondary and primary campuses.
 Ebbw Fawr Learning Community - ASD Base attached at Secondary and Primary School campuses.

The River Centre PRU, Tredegar(Primary) - Ebbw Vale (Secondary)

 
Blaenau Gwent

External Links

[] Blaenau Gwent Council - list of Schools in Blaenau Gwent